Endotricha wilemani is a species of snout moth in the genus Endotricha. It was described by Reginald James West in 1931, and is known from the Philippines.

References

Moths described in 1963
Endotrichini